Buyeo National Museum is a national museum located in Buyeo, Chungcheongnam-do, South Korea. Since Buyeo was once the capital of the Baekje kingdom during the Sabi period (538-660), the Museum is fully devoted to the Baekje culture.

History
It was moved from the downhills of Buso Mountain to the current location.

It is the royal road of Sabi Baekje, where ancient Baekje culture blossomed the most splendidly, and its footsteps and true appearance can be easily found. Under this cultural background, the Buyeo National Museum has a history of about 80 years, starting with the Buyeo Antiquities Preservation Society, which was launched in 1929.

Artifacts

Main display of the museum is Gilt-bronze Incense Burner of Baekje. In particular, the museum preserves and manages the cultural heritage of Baekje, including prehistoric culture in western Chungcheongnam-do. Representative relics include Baekje Geumdong Daehyang-ro, Geumdong Gwaneum Bodhisattva, and Sansu phoenix-patterned bricks.

See also
List of museums in South Korea

References

External links

 Buyeo National Museum Official site

National museums of South Korea
Museums in South Chungcheong Province
Buyeo County